Tosan Gung clan is one of the Korean clans. Their Bon-gwan is in Tosan County, North Hwanghae Province. According to the research held in 2000, the number of the Tosan Gung clan was 555. The word “Gung clan” originated from clan in China. He was from Taiyuan, China. He founded Gija Joseon with Gija after Shang dynasty ended.

See also 
 Korean clan names of foreign origin

References

External links 
 

 
Korean clan names of Chinese origin
Gung clans